Four known bridges have spanned the narrows between the Inner Harbour and Upper Harbour of Victoria, British Columbia, connecting Johnson Street on the east shore with Esquimalt Road on the west shore. The current bridge is Canada's largest single-leaf bascule bridge.

First bridge, 1855 - 1862 
A low wagon bridge was completed in 1855, which blocked marine traffic. It was dismantled in 1862 and was replaced with a ferry service.

Second bridge, 1888 - 1923 

In 1888, a hand-operated swing bridge of limited load capacity was built for rail and foot traffic only.

Third bridge, 1924-2018

Description 
The approaches were fixed steel girders; the east  and the west . Counterweights were of hollow concrete weighing . Operating struts were moved by pinions powered by  electric motors.

History 
The Johnson Street Bridge was designed under the direction of Mr. F. M. Preston, City Engineer in 1920. The Strauss Bascule Bridge Company, which held the patents on the design, prepared the plans for the  bascule spans and the operating machinery. The superstructure of the bridge was fabricated in Walkerville, Ontario of 100 tons of steel. The sub-structure was built by the City of Victoria Engineering Department and required  of concrete.  The bridge was completed at a cost of $918,000 (27 per cent higher than the estimated cost of $720,000) and opened in January 1924.

The bridge originally had street car rails running down the center of the road span, but they were never used, and were removed a few years later. In 1966, the wood deck was replaced with steel grid, as rainwater absorbed by the deck unbalanced the bridge, straining the lifting gear. 
In 1979, extensive repairs were made to the superstructure, which had become severely corroded. Following these repairs, the bridge was painted blue. The paint was selected because the oxides of its pigment are the same colour as the paint so that little fading of the colour occurs. The City of Victoria had used the same blue paint for the lamp standards throughout the city.

In 1995, abnormally high temperatures caused the steel decking to expand to the point the bridge would not open or close properly.

Daily traffic in 2010 was 30,000 trips a day at peak usage, of which 4000 are pedestrians, 3000 cyclists, and 23,000 vehicles.  Until 2011, the rail span for the E&N was used twice a day by the Via Rail Dayliner, for trips up the island towards Duncan, Nanaimo and Courtenay.

Condition assessment 
On April 2, 2009, the preliminary results of an overall condition assessment of the Johnson Street Bridge were presented to Victoria City Council; Council gave approval-in-principle on April 23, 2009 to replace the 85-year-old Johnson Street Bridge.

The Delcan Report concluded:
 Based on the findings of this study either a repair or a replacement option could be justified from a cost perspective. There is, however, in our opinion a need to address the seismic vulnerability of the existing bridge given that it is heavily trafficked and located in the most seismically active city in Canada. In this report we have suggested that this vulnerability should be addressed within 2 to 3 years by implementing a seismic retrofit or by replacing the bridge.

After a detailed presentation by City Engineering staff and Delcan engineering consultants, and lengthy discussion by Council, an approval-in-principle to proceed with replacement of the bridge was made. 
"Today’s decision is an exciting first step that will significantly improve a vital transportation corridor to downtown.  There is a tremendous amount of work ahead and we will continue to make thoughtful, prudent decisions as we proceed through this process."  Mayor Dean Fortin. 
On July 9, 2009, Victoria City Council asked staff to proceed with pursuing a design-build model and developing terms of reference for an advisory panel of community representatives to participate in the Johnson Street Bridge Replacement Project.

On July 24, 2009, seven residents of Greater Victoria were named to the Johnson Street Bridge Citizen Advisory Committee and City Council awarded the Owner's Representative contract to MMM Group Limited to project manage the replacement of the 85-year-old bascule bridge. Victoria City Council was presented on September 8, 2009 with the 3 design concepts for the new Johnson Street Bridge.

On September 24, 2009, City Council decided on the Rolling Bascule Bridge as the design for the new Johnson Street Bridge after reviewing public feedback, recommendations from the Citizens Advisory Committee and advice from a staff technical committee. On November 19, 2009, the city council voted in favour of an Alternate Approval Process to require a counter petition. (Vote, out of 8: 4 in favour, 2 against, 2 absent) If more than 10% of residents (6400) would oppose the borrowing bylaw, then the issue would go to a referendum.

During October and November 2009, the Province of BC declined to contribute to funding the bridge project. A few weeks later the federal government approved a $21 million grant for the replacement project. Federal funding came from the Build Canada Fund.

In December 2009, a counter petition was launched to force the city to go to a referendum to obtain approval for funding bylaw No.09-057 to borrow $42 million towards the total of $63 million, with $21 million coming from federal funding. The text of the petition reads: "I, the undersigned elector residing or owning real property within the City of Victoria, do hereby present my name on this elector response form for the purpose of opposing the Council of the City of Victoria adopting Loan Authorization (Johnson Street Bridge) Bylaw No. 09-057 without first obtaining the assent of the electors by a vote (referendum)." Signatures were to be gathered by January 4, 2010. On January 4, 2010, organizers presented a successful counter petition to City Hall, with 9872 valid Victoria elector signatures. The borrowing bylaw for the bridge project went to a referendum. In February 2010, the city commissioned MMM Group to prepare a full Class C report on comparable options for replacement and rehabilitation.

On May 27, 2010, the results of an Ipsos Reid survey were released. Residents taking the survey ranked their priority factors for the bridge as: a dedicated pedestrian walkway, lifespan of the bridge, cost, dedicated bike lanes, accessibility for other users (wheelchairs, scooters, strollers, visually impaired), and safety, above heritage value and having a rail crossing. Business owners did not see a benefit from one bridge option over the other, but concerns over cost and construction issues including potential closures were noted.

On June 11, 2010, Banjar Management's Economic Impact Assessment identified economic benefits of the bridge to "range between $48 million and $54 million for the rehabilitation alternative and $47 to $53 million for replacement of the bridge over the four to five years required for project delivery." 

Negative economic impacts were assessed as follows:
 DOWNTOWN VICTORIA BUSINESS IMPAIRMENT
 Full closure $10.3 million
 One lane open $5.1 million
 Two lanes open $2.6 million
 VEHICLE DIVERSION TRAVEL TIME COSTS
 Full closure $1.6 million
 One lane open $1.0 million
 Two lanes open $0.4 million
 BUS DIVERSION COSTS ONE YEAR (TWO YEAR)
 Transit Operation Cost $0.5 million ($1.0 million)
 Transit passenger travel time $1.0 million ($2.0 million)

On June 14, 2010, MMM Engineering Group made a presentation to council of their report on the rehabilitation and replacement options, including updated cost estimates,  revised timelines,  economic impact study of potential closures and options for different levels of seismic upgrading (6.5m vs 8.5m). Refurbishment, with seismic upgrades to 8.5 as recommended in the report, and a third, new span to be a multi-use bridge, was estimated to cost 103 million. Replacement of the existing structure, with accompanying work on the approaches to the bridge, with priority given to a mix of users including vehicles, pedestrians and cyclists, was estimated to cost 89 million. The MMM Group study was also peer-reviewed by Stantec Consulting Ltd, Victoria. Stantec found the proposed bridge "technically appropriate", and that the projected costs for both rehab and replacement were "considered reasonable."

On June 17, the city council decided to ask other municipalities to help fund the costs of maintaining the rail link. This would reduce the cost of refurbishment by $23 million, and replacement by $12 million. Long-term planning for commuter rail to the western communities will be affected if the rail line no longer crosses into downtown Victoria, and instead terminates in Victoria West. The deadline for obtaining this funding was August 12, 2010.  The City Council also voted on this date to update the bridge to a seismic standard of 8.5 magnitude.

On July 8, 2010, information packages and numbered surveys were sent out to all Victoria residents. The city invited input up to the August 12 deadline. During the month of July, City of Victoria hosted 2 open houses and bridge tours to provide information on the projects to residents. City staff, engineers, and project managers were present to answer questions.

On August 12, 2010, Victoria city councillors voted to replace the Johnson Street Bridge, rather than refurbish the existing bridge. All councillors except for Coun. Geoff Young supported replacing the bridge. The vote was done after tours, open houses, and surveys were done to inform residents of Victoria of the options. An Ipsos-Reid survey found that 64% and 68% of residents and businesses respectively preferred replacing the bridge with a new one. A referendum would still be held on November 20, 2010 to ask residents if they support the city borrowing money for the cost of the new bridge. On November 20, 2010 the referendum to support the city borrowing money for the cost of the new bridge passed 61% to 39%. The new bridge was scheduled to be completed in 2015, at which time the old bridge would be removed.

Closure of rail span 
On March 31, 2011, the rail span was closed to rail traffic after a routine inspection found corrosion damage on key structural elements. A preliminary estimate of repair costs was $120,000.
The railway span and approaches were removed in February 2012 to make room for the new bridge.

Rail freight service up Store St. to commercial properties on the east side of the Upper Harbour had been discontinued decades before. Since then, the line terminated at a small passenger station beside the bridge. Victoria–Courtenay passenger service was suspended indefinitely in March 2011 due to deteriorating track.

Closure of bridge 
On March 31, 2018, the road span was closed to pedestrian traffic, after being closed to vehicular traffic two days earlier. The closing/commissioning ceremony was attended by Victoria City Councillors, mayors from across the Capital Regional District, project managers and engineers for the new bridge, and members of the public. The road span and approaches were removed during spring 2018.

Fourth bridge, 2018 - 

Construction of a rolling bascule bridge beside the third bridge began in 2013, and opened to the public on March 31, 2018.

As of December 31, 2017, actual costs of $96.08 million had been incurred, to an approved budget of $105.06 million. 

The bridge affords a three-lane roadway, a pedestrian walkway on the south side, and a multi-use pathway on the north side.

See also 
 Joseph Strauss (engineer)
 List of bascule bridges
 List of bridges in Canada

References

External links

City of Victoria Johnson St Bridge Replacement Project
Johnson St Bridge.org

Buildings and structures in Victoria, British Columbia
Bascule bridges
Bridges completed in 1924
Railway bridges in British Columbia
Road bridges in British Columbia